is a Japanese theatre, film, and television actor.

Early life and education 
Hira was born in Setagaya, Tokyo, Japan to actors Mikijirō Hira and Yoshiko Sakuma. He was raised in Japan until he was 15 years old. He went to high school at Moses Brown School in Providence, Rhode Island, United States, and then attended Brown University.

Career 
He made his theatrical debut in 2002 with Rokumeikan which was written by Yukio Mishima. He worked closely with his father Mikijirō Hira, who was also a Japanese actor. Takehiro played the role of Iago in the production of Othello with his father playing Othello. He received major recognition when he played the last shogun Yoshinobu Tokugawa in the NHK taiga drama Atsuhime. He has appeared in several films of Takashi Miike, including Hara-Kiri: Death of a Samurai, Ace Attorney and Aku no Kyoten. He plays Natsuka Masaie in the big-budget film Nobou's Castle.

International experience 
He played the role of the Player Queen in the English stage production of Hamlet in 2005, in which the title role was played by Michael Maloney. This three-month tour was received well at many places in the UK. 

Hira played the lead role in the 2019 British TV series Giri/Haji. He has also had notable parts in the American films Lost Girls & Love Hotels (2020) and Snake Eyes (2021).

Filmography

Films

Television
{| class="wikitable"
|- 
! Year
! Title
! Role
! Notes
|-
|rowspan="3"| 2003 || Cosmetic||  ||
|-
| Love to be loved ||  ||
|-
| Special Mission Boss ||   ||
|-
|rowspan="3"| 2004 || Go Ryoma|| Kurata Ike ||
|-
| Mito Komon || Guest Star  ||
|-
| The Clan of Inugami || Kiyotake  ||
|-
| 2005 || Nada sousou||    ||
|-
|rowspan="1"|2006 ||Delicious Proposal || Hinohara  ||
|-
| 2008 || Atsuhime|| Tokugawa Yoshinobu ||Taiga drama
|-
|rowspan="3"| 2009 || Dandan|| Sawada   ||Asadora
|-
| Lineage of Cop ||Terrorist   ||
|-
| Counter Terrorist Police|| Kubota  ||
|-
|rowspan="2"| 2010 || The Chapter of Mountain|| Hideo || Guest Star  
|-
| The diary of Doctor Chizuru || || Guest Star 
|-
|rowspan="8"| 2011 || Fake|| K || Guest Star
|-
| Go || Saji Kazunari  ||Taiga drama
|-
| Woman from Kyoto Police || Takuma Ōkura || Guest Star
|-
| Absolute Zero || Sawada || 
|-
| Tsukahara Bokuden || Samon Yamazaki ||  
|-
| Boyfriend,husband and male friend || Hiroki Yagi || 
|-
| Science Investigation || || Guest star  
|-
| The return from Pearl Harbor || Lieutenant Iwase ||
|-
|rowspan="3"| 2012 || Pioneers|| Morimitsu ||
|-
| The Life of Juzo Itami || Juzo Itami || Lead role  
|-
| Umechan Sensei || Sanada ||
|-

|rowspan="3"| 2013 || Ooka echizen'|| Shogun ||
|-
| Tokuso Saizensen || Benitake || 
|-
| Mottomo nagai Ginga || Seike || 
|-
|rowspan="4"| 2014 || Shinzanmono|| Kajita ||
|-
| Iryu Team Dragon || Sakurai || 
|-
| Kindaichi || Hoshino || 
|-
| Kenkaku shibai || Okubo ||Guest Star 
|-
|rowspan="9"| 2015 || Aibo|| Tobishiro ||Guest Star
|-
| Kaze no Touge || Washisu || Guest Star
|-
| Keibuho Sugiyama Shintaro || Yabuki || Guest Star
|-
| 64 || Akama || 
|-
| Ishitachi no Renai jijyo || izaki || 
|-
| Ishino Mayu || Kadowaki || Wowow drama
|-
| Cho no Sanmyaku || Yukio Tabuchi|| Lead
|-
| Shitamachi Rocket || Kusaka || 
|-
| Onnnatachi no Tokuso || Kuryu || 
|-
|rowspan="4" |2016 || Sanada Maru|| Takeda Katsuyori ||Taiga drama 
|-
| Fragile || Kosaka || Guest Star 
|-
| 99.9 || Yamashiro || Guest Star 
|-
| IQ246 || Kasahara || Guest Star 
|-
|rowspan="2"| 2017 || Uso no Senso|| Toru Kushima || 
|-
| Iryu Sosa || kurihara || Guest Star 
|-
|rowspan="1"| 2019|| Giri/Haji|| Kenzo Mori || 
|-
|rowspan="1"| 2021|| Yasuke|| Nobunaga Oda || ONA
|-
| 2023
| The Swarm ||Riku Sato || 
|-
|}

 Stage 
 Rokumeikan (2002)
 King Lear, Edmund (2003)
 And Then There Were None, Philip Lombart (2004)
 Hamlet, Player Queen (2005)
 Korikoribanashi (2006)
 Othello, Iago (2007)
 Genghis Khan, Title role (2008)
 Gabrielle Chanel (2009)
 The Film of the Nation, Gustav Friedrich (2011)
 Bouye (2011)
 Harvest Albert,(2012)
 Pygmalion Dr. Higgins (2013)
 HInoyouni Sabishi Anegaite (2014)
 Tokaido Yotsuya Kaidan (2015)
 Kakuonnna' (2016)
 Super Kabuki (2016–18)
 Otoko no Hanamichi (2017)
 Yukinojo Henge (2017)
 Phedre (2017)

References

External links
 Management agency profile 

1974 births
Japanese male film actors
Japanese male stage actors
Japanese male television actors
Living people
Male actors from Tokyo
People from Setagaya
Columbia University alumni
20th-century Japanese male actors
21st-century Japanese male actors
Moses Brown School alumni
Brown University alumni